Kunigunde, Kunigunda, or Cunigunde, is a European female name of German origin derived from "kuni" (clan, family) and "gund" (war). In Polish this is sometimes Kunegunda or Kinga. People with such names include:
Kunigunde of Rapperswil (c. early 4th century), Christian saint
Cunigunda of Laon, wife of Bernard of Italy (797–818)
Cunigunde of Swabia (died 918), wife and consort of King Conrad I of East Francia
Holy Roman Empress St. Cunigunde (of Luxembourg) (c. 975 – 1040), wife and consort of Holy Roman Emperor St. Henry II
Queen Kunigunde (of Hohenstaufen) (1200? – 13 September 1248), wife and consort of Wenceslaus I of Bohemia 
Queen Kunigunda (of Slavonia) (died 1285), consort of Bohemia and its regent from 1278 to 1285
St. Kinga of Poland (1234–1292), Patroness of Poland and Lithuania
Kunigunde of Poland (c. 1298 – 1331), daughter of King Wladyslaw I the Elbow-High of Poland
Cunigunde of Poland (died 1357), wife of Louis VI the Roman, Duke of Bavaria and Margrave of Brandenburg
Kunigunde von Orlamünde (1303–1382), consort of Otto VI, Count of Weimar-Orlamünde
Kunigunde of Sternberg (died 1449), first wife of George of Poděbrady
Queen Kunigunde of Bohemia (died 1464), wife and consort of King Matthias of Hungary
Kunigunde of Austria (died 1520), archduchess and wife of Albert IV, Duke of Bavaria
Theresa Kunegunda Sobieska (1676–1730), Electress of Bavaria and of the Electorate of the Palatinate
 Kunigunde Streicher, wife of Julius Streicher
Kunegunda Godawska-Olchawa (b. 1951), Polish Olympic slalom canoeist

Fictional or legendary
Princess Kunegunda, from a legend of the Chojnik Castle
Cunégonde, a fictional character in Voltaire's novel Candide

See also
936 Kunigunde, main-belt asteroid

Notes 

Feminine given names